Ib Nielsen (13 July 1919 – 21 November 1994) was a Danish épée fencer. He competed at the 1948 and 1952 Summer Olympics.

References

External links
 

1919 births
1994 deaths
People from Odsherred Municipality
Danish male épée fencers
Olympic fencers of Denmark
Fencers at the 1948 Summer Olympics
Fencers at the 1952 Summer Olympics
Sportspeople from Region Zealand